A basal dendrite is a dendrite that emerges from the base of a pyramidal cell that receives information from nearby neurons and passes it to the soma, or cell body. Due to their direct attachment to the cell body itself, basal dendrites are able to deliver strong depolarizing currents and therefore have a strong effect on action potential output in neurons.  The physical characteristics of basal dendrites vary based on their location and species that they are found in. For example, the basal dendrites of humans are overall found to be the most intricate and spine-dense, as compared to other species such as Macaques. It is also observed that basal dendrites of the prefrontal cortex are larger and more complex in comparison to the smaller and simpler dendrites that can be seen within the visual cortex. Basal dendrites are capable of vast amounts of analog computing, which is responsible for many of the different nonlinear responses of modulating information in the neocortex. Basal dendrites additionally exist in dentate granule cells for a limited time before removal via regulatory factors. This removal usually occurs before the cell reaches adulthood, and is thought to be regulated through both intracellular and extracellular signals. Basal dendrites are part of the more overarching dendritic tree present on pyramidal neurons. They, along with apical dendrites, make up the part of the neuron that receives most of the electrical signaling. Basal dendrites have been found to be involved mostly in neocortical information processing.

Dendritic arbor 
Basal dendrites are part of sampling dendritic arbors. These arbors are classified as sampling because they are not completely space filling, but make more than one specific, or selective connection. For example, at the CA1 pyramidal cell of a rat, there are 5 basal dendrites at the soma with 30 branch points, while space filling dendritic arbors can contain hundreds of branch points, and selective arbors can contain as few as 0 or 1. Figure 2 is a representation of a CA1 pyramidal cells of a rat, showing many branch points and dendritic length.

Gene expression 
In reference to a study on the genes related to basal dendrites, there is proven association with the TAOK2 gene and its interaction with the NPR1-SEMA3A signaling pathway. Research shows growth of basal dendrites when more of the TAOK2 gene is expressed while lower expression decreases the number of dendrites within mice. Additionally, decreasing expression of basal dendrites occurs when the Nrp1 gene is downregulated. Though, the effect can be cancelled through overexpression of TAOK2.

References

Further reading 

 
 

Cerebrum
Neurons